Valentino Murataj (born 15 August 1996) is an Albanian professional footballer who plays as a midfielder for Albanian club Partizani.

Career statistics

Clubs

References

External links
Valentino Murataj at the Albanian Football Association

1996 births
Living people
People from Fier County
People from Fier
Sportspeople from Fier
Association football midfielders
Albanian footballers
KF Bylis Ballsh players
Kategoria Superiore players
Kategoria e Parë players
Kategoria e Dytë players